The Assyrian flag (  or  ) is the flag widely used to represent the Assyrian nation in the homeland and in the diaspora.

Its two components, the star of Utu/Shamash, which was a symbol for the god Shamash, and which was also standardly used on poles since the Akkadian Empire as a symbol for the nation, is combined with the ancient symbol of the god Ashur.

George Bit Atanus first designed the flag in 1968; the Assyrian Universal Alliance, Assyrian National Federation and Bet-Nahrain Democratic Party all adopted the flag in 1971. The flag has a white background with a golden circle at the center, surrounded by a four-pointed star in blue. Four triple-colored (red-white-blue), widening, wavy stripes connect the center to the four corners of the flag. The figure of pre-Christian Assyrian God Ashur, known from Iron Age iconography, features above the centre.

Symbolism
The golden circle at the center represents the sun, which, by its exploding and leaping flames, generates heat and light to sustain the earth and all its living things. The four-pointed star surrounding the sun symbolizes the land, its light blue color symbolizing tranquility.

The wavy stripes extending from the center to the four corners of the flag represent the three major rivers of the Assyrian homeland: the Tigris, the Euphrates, and the Great Zab. The lines are small at the center and become wider as they spread out from the circle. The dark blue represents the Euphrates. The red stripes, whose blood-red hue stands for courage, glory, and pride, represent the Tigris. The white lines in between the two great rivers symbolize the Great Zab; its white color stands for tranquility and peace. Some interpret the red, white, and blue will gather all the Assyrians back to their homeland to stand strong and fight for what they want and what they have gained.

The star on the flag is the old star symbol associated with Shamash, also known as Utu, the sun deity also associated with the planet Saturn. He was worshipped in the ancient Mesopotamian region. He was apparently the deity who provided leaders like Hammurabi, Ur-Nammu, and Gudea with divine laws.

The archer figure symbolizes the pre-Christian god Ashur.

Previous flags

Prior to World War I, Western Assyrians from the Tur Abdin region of Turkey designed an Assyrian flag consisting of a horizontal tricolor with the colors pink, white, and red, with three white stars at the upper hoist. The pink, white, and red bars represented the loyalty, purity, and determination of the Assyrian people, and the three white stars represent the three names or components of the Assyrian nation, Assyrians, Syriacs, and Chaldeans.
This flag was used during delegation meetings with Assyrian politicians and Western powers post World War I. It was also in use by the Assyrian National Federation, later renamed the Assyrian American Federation and the Assyrian American National Federation, from its founding in 1933 until 1975 when they adopted the current Assyrian flag.

During the First World War, the Assyrian volunteers commanded by Agha Petros used a red flag with a white cross. Agha Petros' personal standard was the flag of the Volunteers but made of silk, with a golden fringe added, and the words "Trust God and follow the Cross" written in Assyrian above the cross.

Gallery
Variants

Inspirations

Other flags

See also
Aramean-Syriac flag
Chaldean Catholics
Assyrian nationalism
Ethnic flag

References

External links
The Origins and Description of the Assyrian Flag
Assyrian Information Management (AIM) - The Origins and Description of the Assyrian Flag
Assyrian International News Agency (AINA)
Assyrian flag at Flags of the World
The Origins and Description of the Assyrian Flag

Ethnic flags
Assyrian nationalism
Religious flags
Flags of indigenous peoples
Flags introduced in 1971